Shiv Dayal Singh, called by the honorific "Param Purush Puran Dhani Huzur Soami Ji Maharaj" by his disciples and devotees, was born on 25 August 1818 in Agra in the colonial era British India (present-day Agra, Uttar Pradesh, India), and died on 15 June 1878 in the same city. His parents were followers of a spiritual guru Tulsi Saheb. Shiv Dayal Singh was the founder and first spiritual leader of Radha Soami a 19th-century spiritual sect.

Early life
The parents of Shiv Dayal Singh were residents of Punjab, but moved to Agra before his birth at the behest of the colonial British government who had set up a major military center there and relied heavily on Sikhs from the Punjab region to staff the base. At the age of five, Shiv Dayal Singh was sent to school where he learnt Hindi, Urdu, Persian and Gurumukhi, Arabic and Sanskrit. His father, Seth Dilwali Singh was a Sahejdhari Khatri. His mother's name was Mata Maha Maya. He had two brothers named Seth Partap Singh (alias Chachaji Saheb) and Seth Rai Bindraban. His marriage to Mata Naraini Devi (later called "Radha Ji" by followers and devotees), daughter of Lala Izzat Rai of Faridabad was arranged at an early age. He had no children. His family including his father, mother, mother-in-law, sister and his wife were followers of Guru Nanak, and Sant Tulsi Saheb of Hathras. During hiv Dayal Singh's childhood, the family also sought the spiritual tutelage of as a living guru from Sant Tulsi Saheb. But, he didn't take initiation from him. Shiv Dayal Singh acquired no spiritual guru in his life.

Adulthood
After Shiv Dayal Singh completed his education, he became a Persian language translator to a government officer. He left the job and became a teacher of Persian language. Once his brother gained an employment at Indian post office, he left his Persian language job, and joined his father's moneylending business. He spent increasing amount of his time, to religious pursuits. He began giving spiritual discourses based on the scriptures of Sikhism and writings of Tulsi Sahib of Hathras.

Practice
After the death of Sant Tulsi Saheb in 1843, Shiv Dayal Singh practiced Surat Shabd Yoga for 17 years in almost total seclusion in a room within a room. He started holding Satsang (spiritual discourse) publicly on Vasant Panchami (a spring festival) in 1861, and continued for 17 years. Thus Basant Panchami is a very special day for the followers of the Radhasoami Faith.

Teachings
Shiv Dayal Singh originally referred to the Supreme Being with the names "Sat Nām" (True Name) and "Anāmi" (Nameless). The term Rādhāsoāmi was used after Hazur Rai Saligram Bahadur became a disciple. On the request of Saligram Bahadur, Singh declared Satsang open on Basant Panchami Day on 1861. The spiritual practice taught by Shiv Dayal Singh is called as Surat Shabd Yoga by his followers. He used to consider Sat Nām, Sār Nām, Sār Shabad, Sat Purush and Sat Lok the same thing, which he would call formless. Shiv Dayal Singh also used to smoke Huqqa and asked his disciples to prepare it for a guru as a service. 

His bani (poetical compositions) and sayings from satsang were published in two books after he died. Both are called Sar Bachan or Sar Vachan (meaning 'conclusive utterances') :
 Sar Vachan Vartik (Sar Bachan in prose)
 Sar Vachan Chhand Band (Sar Bachan in verse)
Sar Vachan Vartik is in two parts: part one being an introduction written by Salig Ram and part two compiled of notes taken from the discourses of  Shiv Dayal Singh, which he delivered in satsang up to 1878. They cover important teachings of the faith.
His poems in Sar Vachan Chhand Band are replete with emotional appeal - a blending of popular poetic expressions from different languages of north India such as, Khari-Boli, Awadhi, Brijbhasha, Rajasthani and Gurumukhi.

Soami Bagh and Dayal Bagh 
The locality called "Soami Bagh" ("Soami Ji's Garden"), the former home of Shiv Dayal Singh and the present location of his tomb-shrine, is currently owned by the Radha Soami Satsang Agra branch, and controlled by the twin organizations known as the Radhasoami Satsang Central Administrative Council and the Radhasoami Trust (called "the Council and the Trust" for short). Its across-the-street neighbor "Dayalbagh" ("Garden of the Merciful") is owned and controlled by the organization Radha Soami Satsang Dayalbagh. Dayal Bagh and its founder-guru Sir Anand Swarup, Kt. were broadcast to the Western public by Paul Brunton in his famed A Search in Secret India. Sir Anand Swarup received a knighthood for the massive social construction work performed at Dayal Bagh. The two organizations, Council/Trust and Dayalbagh, are both existent and functioning. The major dispute between the two groups is due to two divergent views: The members of Council/Trust claim that Council/Trust is the "parent stock" of Radhasoami faith.
 
The members of Dayalbagh Sabha want access to the tomb-shrine of Shiv Dayal Singh. The tomb-shrine (called ‘Samadh’), was built over 100 years by efforts of the Council/Trust. Soami Bagh Council/Trust allows all satsangis and tourists to visit Samadh, but does not allow religious processions in the Holy Samadh from anyone outside the Council/Trust. 
In this light, Dayalbagh Sabha organised "SPIRICON 2010", a conference of various organizations who revere Shiv Dayal Singh (boycotted by Council/Trust), to promote mutual respect and to petition access to the tomb-shrine of supreme guru Shiv Dayal Singh.

See also
 Contemporary Sant Mat movements
 Dayalbagh
 Sant Mat

References

External links
 http://www.radhasoamisatsang.org
 https://web.archive.org/web/20080410220324/http://www.radhaswamidinod.org/faith.htm
 http://www.aors-dbbs.org/index.html
 http://www.sikh-heritage.co.uk/movements/radhasoamis/The%20radhasoamis.htm
 http://malankazlev.com/kheper/topics/chakras/chakras-SantMat.htm
 https://web.archive.org/web/20080509170243/http://www.seekersway.org/seekers_guide/radhasoami_1_g.html
 http://www.radhasoami-faith.info/Books_Frame.shtml
 Radha Soami Satsang Beas
 Science of the Soul
 Sant Mat - Surat Shabd Yoga: Contemporary Guru Lines & Branches
 http://radhasoamidayal.net/GuruIntro.html
 http://eacharya.inflibnet.ac.in/data-server/eacharya-documents/548158e2e41301125fd790cf_INFIEP_72/110/ET/72-110-ET-V1-S1

1818 births
People from Agra
Radha Soami
Sant Mat gurus
Surat Shabd Yoga
Modern yoga gurus
Indian yoga teachers
Indian spiritual teachers
Founders of new religious movements
People considered avatars by their followers
1878 deaths